The 2022 Cavalry FC season will be the fourth season in the history of Cavalry FC. In addition to the Canadian Premier League, the club competed in the Canadian Championship.

Current squad 
As of September 2, 2022

Transfers

In

Loans in

Draft picks 
Cavalry FC will make the following selections in the 2022 CPL–U Sports Draft. Draft picks are not automatically signed to the team roster. Only those who are signed to a contract will be listed as transfers in.

Out

Pre-season and friendlies
Cavalry FC made a pre-season trip to Mexico where the club spent ten days training at the IA Sports Facility south of Monterrey and played in friendlies against Correcaminos, the Tigres B team, and a team from the Mexican third division, recording one win, one draw, and one loss.

Competitions
Matches are listed in Calgary local time: Mountain Daylight Time (UTC−6) until November 5, and Mountain Standard Time (UTC−7) otherwise.

Overview

Canadian Premier League

Table

Results by match

Matches

Canadian Championship

Statistics

Squad and statistics 

|-

|-

|-

|}

Top scorers

Disciplinary record

References

External links 
Official Site

2022
2022 Canadian Premier League
Canadian soccer clubs 2022 season